Renqiu is a county-level city in Hebei province, China. It is the location of North China Oil Field.

Administrative divisions
Subdistricts:
Xinhua Road Subdistrict, Xihuan Road Subdistrict, Yongfeng Road Subdistrict

Towns:
Chu'an, Shimenqiao, Lübaogong, Changfeng, Maozhou, Gougezhuang, Liangzhao, Xinzhongyi

Townships:
Yilunbao Township, Qingta Township, Beixinzhuang Township, Qijianfang Township, Beihan Township, Yucun Township, Majiawu Township

Climate

Notable persons
 Ji Xiaocheng

External links

County-level cities in Hebei
Cangzhou